The 1970 Valley State Matadors football team represented San Fernando Valley State College—now known as California State University, Northridge—as a member of the California Collegiate Athletic Association (CCAA) during the 1970 NCAA College Division football season. Led by Leon McLaughlin in his second and final season as head coach, Valley State compiled an overall record of 4–6 with a mark of 1–2 in conference play, placing third in the CCAA. The Matadors played home games at Birmingham High School in Van Nuys, California.

Schedule

References

Valley State
Cal State Northridge Matadors football seasons
Valley State Matadors football